Genetic studies on Arabs refers to the analyses of the genetics of ethnic Arab populations within the Middle East and North Africa. The Arab world has one of the highest rates of genetic disorders globally; some 906 pathologies are endemic to the Arab states, including thalassaemia, Tourette's syndrome, Wilson's disease, Charcot-Marie-Tooth disease, mitochondrial encephalomyopathies, and Niemann-Pick disease.

Databases 

Several organizations maintain genetic databases for each Arabic country. The Centre for Arab Genomic Studies (CAGS) is the main organization based in the United Arab Emirates. It initiated a pilot project to construct the Catalogue for Transmission Genetics in Arabs (CTGA) database for genetic disorders in Arab populations. At present, the CTGA database is centrally maintained in Dubai, and hosts entries for nearly 1540 Mendelian disorders and related genes. This number is increasing as researchers are joining the largest Arab scientific effort to define genetic disorders described in the region. The Center promotes research studies on these emergent disorders.
Some of the genetic disorders endemic to the Arab world are: hemoglobinopathy, sickle cell anemia, glucose-6-phosphate dehydrogenase deficiency, and fragile X syndrome (FXS), which is an inherited genetic condition with critical consequences. The Centre provide information about specific countries, and maintain a list of Genomic diseases.

Specific rare autosomal recessive diseases are high in Arabic countries like Bardet Biedl syndrome, Meckel syndrome, congenital chloride diarrhea, severe childhood autosomal recessive muscular dystrophy (SMARMD)
lysosomal storage diseases and PKU are high in the Gulf states. Dr Teebi's book provides detailed information and by country.
Even the Middle East respiratory syndrome coronavirus (MERS-CoV) that was first identified in Saudi Arabia last year, it has infected 77 people, mostly in the Middle East and Europe. Forty of them – more than half – have died. But MERS is not yet a pandemic, could become pervasive in genetic disease patient.

Dr Thurman' guidebook about Rare genetic diseases Another book Arabic genetic disorders layman guide Saudi Journal article about genetic diseases in Arabic countries
The highest proportion of genetic disorders manifestations are:
congenital malformations followed by endocrine metabolic disorders and then by neuron disorders (such as Neuromotor disease)and then by blood immune disorders and then neoplasms. The Mode of Inheritance is mainly autosomal recessive followed by autosomal dominant.
Some of the diseases are beta-thalassemia mutations, sickle-cell disease, congenital heart-disease, glucose-6-phosphate dehydrogenase deficiency, alpha-thalassemia, molecular characterization, recessive osteoperosis, gluthanione-reducatsafe DEf. A study about sickle cell anemia in Arabs article about Birth defects 6Glucose Phisphate isomere deficiency responsible for unexpected hemolytic episodes. one of late Dr Teebi's syndromes. flash cards guide. NY Times article In Palestinian Arabs study study about potential on pharmacology  another study on Arab Palestinians Database of Genetic disorders in Arabs study In Palestinians new general study about databases Database for B thalassemia in Arabs Israeli National genetic bank contains genetic mutations of Arabs Teebi database 2002 2010 genes responsible for genetic diseases among Palestinian Arabs
The next Pan-Arab conference Nov 2013

Diagnosis of genetic disorders 
Diagnosis of genetic disorders after birth is done by clinicians, lab tests, and sometimes genetic testing. Genetic testing profiling screening of pregnant women's fetuses for List of disorders included in newborn screening programs using Microchip Genetic Microarrary might help detect genetic mutations incompatible with life and determining abortion. Some genetic tests of born children might help finding the right treatment. Mothers could test for genetic disorders in the fetus by method of chorionic villus sampling (CVS) or amniocentesis.

Genealogy and geography 
Bare lymphocyte syndrome high in western Arabic block Morocco, type II limb-girdle muscular dystrophy, type 2C in Libya, hemolytic-uremic syndrome in Saudia, ankylosing spondylitis in Egypt and East block, alpha-thalassemia in all countries except Egypt, Syria, and Iraq, cystic fibrosis in Iraq Saudi Yemen Libya Morocco, familial Mediterranean fever fmf in east block and Libya Morocco, beta thalassemia in all countries, g6dh deficiency all countries.

Most genetic markers of Arabs' genetic diseases are phenotypic, i.e. specific mutations of Arab peoples, especially in countries. Even though genetic mutations of Gulf states are mostly the same, but some genetic phenotypes are Kuwaiti etc.

The diseases have geographical distribution among Arab countries such as greater Syria, Gulf states, Yemen, Western block (Morocco, Algeria, Tunisia), because of the restricted marriages to each block or even to one country. Moreover, cousin marriages (consanguinity) and endogamy (marriages restricted to minority sects) exacerbate the problem. Distancing of marriages from distant gene pools might help resolve the problem in Arabic countries. Many of the pronounced genetic deficiencies in Arabs are located on HLA segment on chromosome 6. This same segment mutations are markers of Arabs in Genealogical and forensic profiling tests and studies. Such studies as:
Arab population data on the PCR-based loci:HLA 
HLA polymorphism in Saudi.        
                 
Since over 70% of Arab genetic disorders are autosomal-recessive, meaning the defective gene has to be found in both father and mother, and since the gene pool is similar in population (males and females alike since autosomal chromosomes are admixture from father and mother, in closed societies (marriages from same sect endogamy, or same tribe or even from same country, or even from the same block of countries since it is similar in geographical blocks as shown in the online brochures referenced above.

Discoveries of new syndromes 
Teebi type of hypertelorism (1987)
•• Teebi Shaltout syndrome (1989)
•• Al Gazali syndrome (1994)
•• Megarbane syndrome (2001)

There are even new Arabic names for emerging genetic disorders and syndromes like:            
              
Spectrum of Genetic Disorders in Arabs
•• Lebanese type of mannose 6--phosphate receptor recognition defect (1984)
•• Algerian type of spondylometaphyseal dysplasia (1988)
•• Kuwaiti type of cardioskeletalsyndrome (1990)
•• Yemenite deaf-blind hypopigmentation syndrome (1990)
•• Nablus mask-like facial syndrome (2000)
•• Jerash type of the distal hereditary motor neuropathy (2000)
•• Karak syndrome (2003)
•• Omani type of spondyloepiphy

Uniparental markers

Y-chromosome
Below is the general distribution of Y-DNA haplogroups among populations native to the Arab world:

mtDNA analysis
The maternal ancestral lineages of Arabic countries are very diverse. The original historical maternal ancestral haplogroups of the Near East were mt (maternal) L3 Haplogroup and (maternal) HV1 haplogroup that are still high in Yemen, while in Greater Syria there is a Eurasian maternal gene flow.

HLA antigens
Many of the genetic disorders specific to Arabs are located on HLA segment on chromosome 6. These same segment mutations are also markers of Arabs in genealogical and forensic profiling tests and studies.

Autosomal DNA 
There are four principal West-Eurasian autosomal DNA components that characterize the populations in the Arab world: the Arabian, Levantine, Coptic and Maghrebi components. The Arabian component is the main autosomal element in the Gulf region. It is most closely associated with local Arabic-speaking populations.

 The Arabian component is also found at significant frequencies in parts of the Levant and Northeast Africa. The geographical distribution pattern of this component correlates with the pattern of the Islamic expansion, but its presence in Lebanese Christians, Sephardi and Ashkenazi Jews, Cypriots and Armenians might suggest that its spread to the Levant could also represent an earlier event. A separate study by Iosif Lazarides and colleagues published in the same year, correlated this component with Epipaleolithic Natufians from the Levant. This study produced genome-wide ancient DNA from 44 ancient Near Easterners between ~12,000 and 1,400 BCE, including Natufian hunter–gatherers, and suggested an earlier spread of Natufian ancestry to populations of the Levant and the Eastern Mediterranean. Natufians were found to be of exclusive West-Eurasian origin, most closely related to modern Arabs, followed by Berber peoples. A 2018 re-analysis of Natufian samples, including 279 modern populations as a reference, found that the Natufians were largely of local West-Eurasian origin, but harbored 6.8% Eastern African-related ancestry, specifically an Omotic component, which peaks among the Aari people. It is suggested that this Omotic component may have been introduced into the Levant along with the specific Y-haplogroup sublineage E-M215, also known as "E1b1b", to Western Eurasia.

 The Levantine component is the main autosomal element in the Near East and Caucasus. It peaks among Druze populations in the Levant. The Levantine component diverged from the Arabian component about 15,500-23,700 ypb.

 The Coptic component peaks among Egyptian Copts in Sudan.

 The Maghrebi component is the main autosomal element in the Maghreb. It peaks among the non-Arabized Berber populations in the region. The modern Northern African (Berber) populations have been described as a mosaic of Northern African (Maghrebi), Middle Eastern, European, and Sub-Saharan African-related ancestries.

A genetic study published in the "European Journal of Human Genetics" in Nature (2019) showed that Middle Easterners (Arabs) are closely related to Europeans and Northern Africans as well as to Southwest Asians. The "Arab macropopulation" is generally closely related to other "West-Eurasian" populations, such as Europeans or Iranian peoples. The Arab expansion marked one of the last expansions of West-Eurasian ancestry into Africa, with the earliest scientifically attested West-Eurasian geneflow into Africa being dated back to 23,000 BCE (or already earlier), and may be associated with the spread of Proto-Afroasiatic from the Middle East. Hodgson et al. 2014 found a distinct non-African ancestry component among Northeastern Africans (dubbed "Ethio-Somali"), which split from other West-Eurasian ancestries, most closely to the Arabian ancestry component, about 23,000 years ago, and migrated into Africa pre-agricultural (between 12,000 to 22,000 years ago). This component is suggested to have been present in considerable amounts among the Proto-Afroasiatic-speaking peoples. The authors argue that the Ethio-Somali component and the Maghrebi component descended from a single ancestral lineage, which split from the Arabian lineage and migrated into Africa from the Middle East. In Africa, this West-Eurasian lineage diverged into the Maghrebi component, predominant in Northern Africa, and the Ethio-Somali component, found in significant varying degrees among populations of the Horn of Africa.

In 2021, a study showed no genetic traces of early expansions out-of-Africa in present-day populations in the Near-East, but found Arabians to have elevated Basal Eurasian ancestry that dilutes their Neanderthal ancestry.

See also 
Arab people
Arab studies
Arabization
DNA history of Egypt
Genetic history of the Middle East
Genetic history of North Africa
Genetic studies on Jews
Genetic studies on Moroccans

References

Further reading

External links 
 

Genetic genealogy
Human population genetics
Arabs
DNA
Modern human genetic history
Arab